Central Field or Iwo Jima Air Base  is a former World War II airfield on Iwo Jima in the Bonin Islands, located in the Central Pacific. The Bonin Islands are part of Japan. Today, the base is the only airfield on the island, operated by the Japan Self-Defense Forces.

History

The Japanese had constructed the airfield near the center of island laid out as an "X" of two intersecting runways one  and the other .

Located south and west of the midpoint between Tokyo and Saipan, the island of Iwo Jima was needed by the United States Army Air Forces as an emergency landing site for its B-29 Superfortress strategic bombing campaign against the Empire of Japan. The purpose of the assault was to take the island for the three Japanese airfields so that the U.S. Navy Seabees could turn them in to United States facilities. Prior to the assault NCB 133 was assigned to get the southern Motoyama #1 airfield operational and NCB 31 was assigned the central Motoyama #2. On D-plus 5 that was changed because of the casualties the 133rd had taken and the 31st CB was assigned to Motoyama #1. On D-plus 6 the assignments were changed again. The 62nd CB attached to the reserve in V Amphibious Corps was given Motoyama #1, the 31st CB was given Motoyama #2 and the 133rd was given the barely started Motoyama #3. However, the Seabees and elements of the 2nd Separate Engineer Battalion worked together until the Marine ground forces had taken possession of their respective airfield construction assignments.

A second runway parallel to the east-northeast to west-southwest runway was also built; both were built to accommodate B-29s. During the day, 102 B-29s, returning from a raid on Japan, landed on the field. Several sub-grade failures occurred in the construction because of ground water and soft spots in the sub-grade. In some places the paving sealed off steam which had been generated below the surface and when the steam condensed, the sub-grade became saturated. For normal operations, this field could accommodate 120 P-51 Mustangs, 30 B-24 Liberators and 20 B-29s.

Central Field was headquarters for VII Fighter Command of the  Twentieth Air Force from March 1 – December 1, 1945, along with the intelligence-gathering 41st Photographic Reconnaissance Squadron from August though mid-September 1945. Operational fighter squadrons which performed B-29 escort missions from Central Field were:

 506th Fighter Group, April 24 – December 3, 1945
 414th Fighter Group, July 7 – December 23, 1945
 21st Fighter Group, March 26 - July 16, 1945
 548th Night Fighter Squadron, March 5 – June 12, 1945
 549th Night Fighter Squadron, (Ground Echelon), March 14, 1945 – February 5, 1946

After the war, the 20th Air Force fighter squadrons moved out to Japan, Okinawa or the Philippines and Central Field came under the Jurisdiction of Military Air Transport Service (MATS), becoming a refueling stop for MATS aircraft in the Western Pacific. It hosted various communications, weather as well as Far East Materiel Command units for supply and maintenance activities. It was under the command of the Iwo Jima Base Command,  as a satellite of the 6000th Support Wing, Tachikawa Air Base, Japan.

The third incomplete Japanese airfield (Motoyama No. 3)  was built as the "North Field". It required much new construction in rough terrain which consisted principally of consolidated volcanic ash. The initial portion of the work in preparing the sub-grade for the runway entailed the moving of about 200,000-cubic-yards (152,911-cubic-meters) of rock and volcanic ash. Seabee construction was stopped on 27 April and the project was turned over to a USAAF aviation engineer battalion for completion. This field could normally accommodate 50 P-51s and 14 B-24s (and eight B-29s in an emergency). North Field was abandoned after the war; its facilities were used for revetments and munitions storage in support of the other two airfields.

Central Field stayed in American hands until being turned over to the Japanese Government on 27 June 1968. It then became a navigation and weather station of the Japan Maritime Self-Defense Force (Nihon Kaijo Jieitai), and is still used by the U.S. military as an aircraft refueling depot and as a U.S. Navy special pilot training facility.

At any given time about 350 JSDF personnel are posted to Iwo Jima and though the airfield is strictly for military use, commercial flights carrying veterans are frequent visitors.

Of the three WWII airfields, Central Field is the only one that remains in use today.

See also

 USAAF in the Central Pacific
 South Field (Iwo Jima)
Naval Base Iwo Jima

References

External links

 

Airports in Japan
Japan Maritime Self-Defense Force bases
Transport in the Greater Tokyo Area
Central Field